Jean de Fontaney (1643–1710) was a French Jesuit who led a mission to China in 1687.

Jean de Fontaney had been a teacher of mathematics and astronomy at the College Louis le Grand. He was asked by king Louis XIV to set up a mission to China, following a request by Ferdinand Verbiest, in order to spread French and Catholic influence at the Chinese court with the pretext of transmitting scientific knowledge. Jean de Fontaney assembled a group of five other Jesuits to accompany him, all highly skilled in sciences, namely Joachim Bouvet, Jean-François Gerbillon, Louis-Daniel Lecomte, Guy Tachard, and Claude de Visdelou.

Guy Tachard remained in Siam where he was to have a major role, while Jean de Fontaney led the four remaining Fathers to China, where they arrived in February 1688. Upon their arrival in Beijing they were received by the Kangxi Emperor who was favorably impressed by them and retained Jean-François Gerbillion and Joachim Bouvet at the court.

Jean de Fontaney returned to Europe in 1702, where he became Rector of the Collège Royal Henry-Le-Grand in La Flèche until his death there in 1710.

See also
 Jesuit China missions

Notes

References
David E. Mungello Curious land: Jesuit accommodation and the origins of Sinology, University of Hawaii Press, 1989, 

17th-century French Jesuits
1643 births
1710 deaths
18th-century French Jesuits
French Roman Catholic missionaries
Jesuit missionaries in China
French expatriates in China